Sadrabad Rural District is in Nadushan District of Meybod County, Yazd province, Iran. Its constituent villages were in Nadushan Rural District of Khezrabad District, Ashkezar County, before the separation of the rural district from the county and elevation to district status. It was divided into two rural districts and the city of Nadushan. At the most recent National Census of 2016, the population of the rural district was 552 in 168 households. The largest of its 17 villages was Sadrabad, with 509 people.

References 

Meybod County

Rural Districts of Yazd Province

Populated places in Yazd Province

Populated places in Meybod County

fa:دهستان صدرآباد